On April 12, 1910, an earthquake struck with an epicenter off the northern coast of Taiwan. In Taipei and Hsinchu, 13 homes totally collapsed, two were partially collapsed, and an additional 57 were damaged. At least 204 homes were destroyed or damaged in Keelung, Shenkeng and Taoyuan. Sixty people died or were injured. Shaking was felt across Taiwan and the Penghu Islands; strong shaking was felt in the northern half of the island. The intermediate-depth of the earthquake suggest it originated from within the subducting Philippine Sea Plate which undergoes subduction.

See also
List of earthquakes in 1910
List of earthquakes in Taiwan

References

1910 earthquakes
Earthquakes in Taiwan
1910 in Taiwan
1910 in Japan
Earthquakes in Japan